J. B. Royce House and Farm Complex is a historic home and farm complex located at Berkshire in Tioga County, New York. The house was built about 1829 in a vernacular Greek Revival style.  About 1850 it was extensively altered with the construction of a higher, more steeply pitched roof and an ell-shaped Gothic Revival style porch with Tudor-arched details. Also on the property is a contributing mid-19th century barn with decorative bargeboards, a shed, and a small Greek Revival structure now used as a garage.

It was listed on the National Register of Historic Places in 1984.

References

Houses on the National Register of Historic Places in New York (state)
Gothic Revival architecture in New York (state)
Greek Revival houses in New York (state)
Houses completed in 1829
Houses in Tioga County, New York
National Register of Historic Places in Tioga County, New York
Farms on the National Register of Historic Places in New York (state)